The Kinsey Reports are two scholarly books on human sexual behavior, Sexual Behavior in the Human Male (1948) and Sexual Behavior in the Human Female (1953), written by Alfred Kinsey, Wardell Pomeroy, Clyde Martin, and (for Sexual Behavior in the Human Female) Paul Gebhard and published by W.B. Saunders. The two best-selling books were immediately controversial, both within the scientific community and the general public, because they challenged conventional beliefs about sexuality and discussed subjects that had previously been taboo. The validity of Kinsey's methods were also called into question. Kinsey was a zoologist at Indiana University and the founder of the Kinsey Institute for Research in Sex, Gender, and Reproduction (more widely known as the Kinsey Institute).

The sociological data underlying the analysis and conclusions found in Sexual Behavior in the Human Male was collected from approximately 5,300 males over a fifteen-year period. Sexual Behavior in the Human Female was based on personal interviews with approximately 6,000 women. In the latter, Kinsey analyzed data for the frequency with which women participate in various types of sexual activity and looked at how factors such as age, social-economic status and religious adherence influence sexual behavior. Comparisons are made of female and male sexual activities. Kinsey's evidence suggested that women were less sexually active than men.

The ways in which Kinsey collected data have received criticism. It has been suggested that some data in the reports could not have been obtained without collaborations with child molesters. The Kinsey Institute denies this charge, though it acknowledges that men who have had sexual experiences with children were interviewed, with Kinsey balancing what he saw as the need for their anonymity to solicit "honest answers on such taboo subjects" against the likelihood that their crimes would continue. Additionally, concerns over the sample populations used were later addressed by the Kinsey Institute. The conclusion of the Kinsey Institute was that none of Kinsey's original estimates was significantly affected by these data sources.

More recent researchers believe that Kinsey overestimated the rate of same-sex attraction because of flaws in his sampling methods. Nonetheless, his work is considered pioneering and some of the best-known sex research of all time.

Findings

Sexual orientation

Parts of the Kinsey Reports regarding diversity in sexual orientations are frequently used to support the common estimate of 10% for homosexuality in the general population. Instead of three categories (heterosexual, bisexual and homosexual), a seven-point Kinsey scale system was used.

The reports also state that nearly 46% of the male subjects had "reacted" sexually to persons of both sexes in the course of their adult lives, and 37% had at least one homosexual experience. 11.6% of white males (ages 20–35) were given a rating of 3 (about equal heterosexual and homosexual experience/response) throughout their adult lives. The study also reported that 10% of American males surveyed were "more or less exclusively homosexual for at least three years between the ages of 16 and 55" (in the 5 to 6 range).

Seven percent of single females (ages 20–35) and four percent of previously married females (ages 20–35) were given a rating of 3 (about equal heterosexual and homosexual experience/response) on Kinsey Heterosexual-Homosexual Rating Scale for this period of their lives. 2 to 6% of females, aged 20–35, were more or less exclusively homosexual in experience/response, and 1 to 3% of unmarried females aged 20–35 were exclusively homosexual in experience/response.

Criticism 
Although Kinsey sought to work on a more 'complete' report involving 100,000 interviews and considered the initial 1948 publication to be a sample progress report, academics have criticized the sample selection and sample bias in the reports' methodology. Two main issues cited by researchers are that significant portions of the samples come from prison populations and male prostitutes and that people who volunteer to be interviewed about taboo subjects are likely to create a self-selection bias. Both undermine the usefulness of the sample in terms of determining the tendencies of the overall population. In 1948, the same year as the original publication, a committee of the American Statistical Association, including notable statisticians such as John Tukey, condemned the sampling procedure. In a tense meeting with Kinsey, Tukey supposedly declared that even a sample as small as three to five, chosen randomly, would be preferable to hundreds in Kinsey's sample.  Psychologist Abraham Maslow stated that Kinsey did not consider "volunteer bias". The data represented only those volunteering to participate in discussion of taboo topics. Most Americans were reluctant to discuss the intimate details of their sex lives even with their spouses and close friends. Before the publication of Kinsey's reports, Maslow tested Kinsey's volunteers for bias. He concluded that Kinsey's sample was unrepresentative of the general population.  In 1954, leading statisticians, including William Gemmell Cochran, Frederick Mosteller, John Tukey, and W. O. Jenkins issued for the American Statistical Association a critique of Kinsey's 1948 report on the human male, stating:

Critics are justified in their objections that many of the most interesting and provocative statements in the [Kinsey 1948] book are not based on the data presented therein, and it is not made clear to the reader on what evidence the statements are based. Further, the conclusions drawn from data presented in the book are often stated by KPM [Kinsey, Pomeroy, and Martin] in much too bold and confident a manner. Taken cumulatively, these objections amount to saying that much of the writing in the book falls below the level of good scientific writing.

In response, Paul Gebhard, Kinsey's close colleague, "Sexual Behavior in the Human Female" co-author, and successor as director of the Kinsey Institute for Sex Research, cleaned the Kinsey data of purported contaminants, removing, for example, all material derived from prison populations in the basic sample. In 1979, Gebhard (with Alan B. Johnson) published The Kinsey Data: Marginal Tabulations of the 1938–1963 Interviews Conducted by the Institute for Sex Research. Their conclusion, to Gebhard's surprise he claimed, was that none of Kinsey's original estimates were significantly affected by this bias: that is, the prison population and male prostitutes had the same statistical tendency as those who willingly participated in discussion of previously taboo sexual topics. The results were summarized by historian, playwright, and gay-rights activist Martin Duberman, "Instead of Kinsey's 37% (men who had at least one homosexual experience), Gebhard and Johnson came up with 36.4%; the 10% figure (men who were "more or less exclusively homosexual for at least three years between the ages of 16 and 55"), with prison inmates excluded, came to 9.9% for white, college-educated males and 12.7% for those with less education.

More recent researchers have criticized Kinsey's sampling methods and believe that he overestimated the frequency of nonheterosexual behaviors and attractions.

Historian Peter Gay described Sexual Behavior in the Human Male as "methodologically far from persuasive".

Sociologist Edward Laumann stated that the Kinsey Reports were limited to the biology of sex and lacked psychological and clinical information and analysis and that this "meant that sex research did not move into the mainstream of academic credibility. People took their reputations in their hands if they attempted to pursue it." Laumann also acknowledged that "The Kinsey report was a cultural event of enormous consequence."

Kinsey scale

The Kinsey scale is used to measure a person's overall balance of heterosexuality and homosexuality, and takes into account both sexual experience and psychosexual reactions. The scale ranges from 0 to 6, with 0 being completely heterosexual and 6 completely homosexual. An additional category, X, was mentioned to describe those who had "no socio-sexual contacts or reactions," which has been cited by scholars to mean asexuality. The scale was first published in Sexual Behavior in the Human Male (1948) by Kinsey, Wardell Pomeroy and others, and was also prominent in the complementary work Sexual Behavior in the Human Female (1953). Introducing the scale, Kinsey wrote:

The scale is as follows:

Men: 11.6% of white males aged 20–35 were given a rating of 3 for this period of their lives.
Women: 7% of single females aged 20–35 and 4% of previously married females aged 20–35 were given a rating of 3 for this period of their lives. 2 to 6% of females, aged 20–35, were given a rating of 5 and 1 to 3% of unmarried females aged 20–35 were rated as 6.

Marital coitus
The average frequency of marital sex reported by women was 2.8 times a week in the late teens, 2.2 times a week by age 30, and 1.0 times a week by age 50. Kinsey estimated that approximately 50% of all married males had extramarital sex at some time during their married lives. Among the sample, 26% of females had extramarital sex by their forties. Between 1 in 6 and 1 in 10 females from age 26 to 50 were engaged in extramarital sex. However, Kinsey classified couples who have lived together for at least a year as "married", inflating the statistics for extra-marital sex.

Sadomasochism
12% of females and 22% of males reported having an erotic response to a sadomasochistic story.

Biting
Responses to being bitten:

Zoophilia
The report estimated the amount of American citizens that have engaged in zoophilia to be approximately eight million.

Method
Data was gathered primarily by means of subjective report interviews, conducted according to a structured questionnaire memorized by the experimenters (but not marked on the response sheet in any way). The response sheets were encoded in this way to maintain the confidentiality of the respondents, being entered on a blank grid using response symbols defined in advance. The data were later computerized for processing. All of this material, including the original researchers' notes, remains available from the Kinsey Institute to qualified researchers who demonstrate a need to view such materials. The institute also allows researchers to use statistical software in order to analyze the data.

Context and significance

The Kinsey Reports, which together sold three-quarters of a million copies and were translated into thirteen languages, may be considered as some of the most successful and influential scientific books of the 20th century. They were also associated with a change in the public perception of sexuality. In the 1960s, following the introduction of the first oral contraceptive, this change was to be expressed in the sexual revolution. Additionally, in 1966 Masters and Johnson would publish the first of two texts cataloguing their investigations into the physiology of sex, breaking taboos and misapprehensions similar to those Kinsey had confronted more than a decade earlier in a closely related field.

See also
 Kinsey, a film based on the life of Alfred Kinsey
 Klein Sexual Orientation Grid

References

External links
 Kinsey Institute home page
Sexual Behavior in the Human Female - Project MUSE - Johns Hopkins University
 Kinsey's Heterosexual-Homosexual Rating Scale

1940s in LGBT history
1948 non-fiction books
1953 non-fiction books
American non-fiction books
Books by Paul Gebhard
Books by Wardell Pomeroy
English-language books
Non-fiction books about sexuality
Sexology literature
Literature related to the sexual revolution